Harry Clegg (1898 – after 1922) was an English professional association footballer who played as a goalkeeper. He played five matches in the Football League Third Division North for Nelson in the 1921–22 season.

References

1898 births
Year of death missing
Footballers from Burnley
English footballers
Association football goalkeepers
Nelson F.C. players
English Football League players